Lennie Wayne Pond (August 11, 1940 – February 10, 2016) was an American NASCAR driver. He won NASCAR Winston Cup Rookie of the Year honors in 1973, and won his only race at Talladega Superspeedway in 1978 for Ronnie Elder and Harry Ranier.

Career

Lennie W. Pond grew up in the Village of Ettrick, Virginia, racing on his parents' farm, which  Ettrick was home to Pond all his life. In the mid-1950s. Pond started racing modifieds on dirt tracks, then went to asphalt tracks, then to late-model tracks. In 1973, Pond started to run Winston Cup races; his last race with Winston Cup was in 1989 at Richmond International Raceway for Junie Donlavey. Pond got to run all three tracks here—dirt, asphalt and the new track.

His career totals include 234 career starts, one win, 39 top fives, 88 top tens, five poles, and a best championship finish of 5th in 1976. He beat out Darrell Waltrip for rookie of the year honors in 1973. Five years later, Pond won his first career race at Talladega Superspeedway. Before retiring Pond raced his last race on September 10, 1989, at Richmond International Raceway in the Miller High Life 400 where he finished in 11th place.

Pond later became a car salesman at Heritage Chevrolet in Chester, Virginia.

Pond died February 10, 2016, from complications of cancer.

Motorsports career results

NASCAR
(key) (Bold – Pole position awarded by qualifying time. Italics – Pole position earned by points standings or practice time. * – Most laps led.)

Grand National Series

Winston Cup Series

Daytona 500

References

External links
 Pond Interview with John Sealy
 Heritage Chevrolet, Chester, Virginia

1940 births
2016 deaths
NASCAR drivers
People from Ettrick, Virginia
Racing drivers from Virginia